Libya (Kingdom of Libya) competed in the Summer Olympic Games for the first time at the 1964 Summer Olympics in Tokyo, Japan.

Their only competitor at the games, Suliman Fighi Hassan entered the men's marathon, but did not start the race.

References

Official Olympic Reports

Nations at the 1964 Summer Olympics
1964
Olympics